Fossil Mountain is a 6,729-foot-elevation summit located in the Western Grand Canyon, in Coconino County of northern Arizona, Southwestern United States. It is situated ~1.5 miles due east of Mount Huethawali, about 1.0 miles southeast of the Grand Scenic Divide, and 1.0 mi west of Havasupai Point. The Fossil Mountain prominence is a massif-remainder cliff of Kaibab Limestone, and stands above a tableland of the South Rim, a forested plateau of Kaibab Limestone.

Geology
Photos of the Fossil Mountain prominence, a large cliff of Kaibab Limestone, can be seen at Summitpost. The southwest slope of Fossil Mountain is a highly vegetated (trees), and high angle slope to the prominence.

Below the ~350 ft cliff of Kaibab Limestone is about ~250 ft of vegetated slope-forming Toroweap Formation. The Toroweap sits upon a ~500  cliff-formed, Coconino Sandstone, very vertical, and uneroded, (northeast face of Fossil Mountain, overlooking the canyon). The Coconino sits on large slopes of vegetated Hermit Formation.

References

External links

 “The Mts are Calling.com”, Fossil Mountain

Grand Canyon, South Rim
Grand Canyon, South Rim (west)
Grand Canyon
Grand Canyon National Park
Landforms of Coconino County, Arizona
Colorado Plateau
North American 2000 m summits